Valentina Kharlampiyevna Vladimirova (22 November 1927, in Vasylivka – 23 March 1994, in Moscow) was a Ukrainian-born Russian actress. She performed in more than forty films from 1957 to 1992.

Selected filmography

References

External links

Soviet film actresses
Ukrainian film actresses
1927 births
1994 deaths
Russian film actresses
20th-century Russian actresses
Honored Artists of the RSFSR
Gerasimov Institute of Cinematography alumni
Burials at Vagankovo Cemetery